An inflatable air cushion is a bag of fabric or plastic that can be inflated to provide cushioning. Unlike bubble wrap, inflatable air cushions have a check valve to allow the cushion to be inflated or sometimes deflated.

History
Several constructions have been developed, some as early as the 1970s. In the 1980s, a number of inflatable cushion systems were documented.
Before 2000, most inflatable air cushions used a single check valve. However if one part of the cushion was punctured then this packaging would completely deflate. In 2002, several types of continuously independent one way air valve films were introduced. These patents incorporated a one way air valve film, which can be produced continuously and independently. If one air tube is punctured, the other air tubes will still remain inflated.

Concept
A modern cushion is made out of two layers of PE films  with air valve film in between, and heat pressed with high temperature mold to melt them together and create air tubes and shapes, so inflatable air cushions can have a variety of styles and types.
The cushion can be shipped flat and inflated as needed. Once inflated the continuous check valve seals each tube from the others.   
The air pressure inside each of the inflated air cushions is greater than the atmosphere pressure, providing strong compressive strength and flexibility.

Applications
 Protective and void filling materials, including block and brace, corner protection, wrapping, interleaving, top and cross layering.
 Shipping container cushioning
 Thundersticks
 Water resistant seat cushion
 Inflatable bags

See also
 Bubble wrap
 Cushioning
 List of inflatable manufactured goods
Dunnage bag

References

 Yam, K. L., "Encyclopedia of Packaging Technology", John Wiley & Sons, 2009, 

Packaging materials
Inflatable manufactured goods